Caesium iodide or cesium iodide (chemical formula CsI) is the ionic compound of caesium and iodine. It is often used as the input phosphor of an X-ray image intensifier tube found in fluoroscopy equipment.  Caesium iodide photocathodes are highly efficient at extreme ultraviolet wavelengths.

Synthesis and structure

Bulk caesium iodide crystals have the cubic CsCl crystal structure, but the structure type of nanometer-thin CsI films depends on the substrate material – it is CsCl for mica and NaCl for LiF, NaBr and NaCl substrates.

Caesium iodide atomic chains can be grown inside double-wall carbon nanotubes. In such chains I atoms appear brighter than Cs atoms in electron micrographs despite having a smaller mass. This difference was explained by the charge difference between Cs atoms (positive), inner nanotube walls (negative) and I atoms (negative). As a result, Cs atoms are attracted to the walls and vibrate more strongly than I atoms, which are pushed toward the nanotube axis.

Properties

Applications
An important application of caesium iodide crystals, which are scintillators, is electromagnetic calorimetry in experimental particle physics. Pure CsI is a fast and dense scintillating material with relatively low  light yield that increases significantly with cooling. It shows two main emission components: one in the near ultraviolet region at the wavelength of 310 nm and one at 460 nm. The drawbacks of CsI are a high temperature gradient and a slight hygroscopicity.

Caesium iodide is used as a beamsplitter in Fourier transform infrared (FTIR) spectrometers. It has a wider transmission range than the more common potassium bromide beamsplitters, working range into the far infrared. However, optical-quality CsI crystals are very soft and hard to cleave or polish. They should also be coated (typically with germanium) and stored in a desiccator, to minimize interaction with atmospheric water vapors.

In addition to image intensifier input phosphors, caesium iodide is often also used in medicine as the scintillating material in flat panel x-ray detectors.

References

Cited sources

Caesium compounds
Iodides
Alkali metal iodides
Metal halides
Caesium chloride crystal structure